The Col du Petit Ballon (elevation ) is a mountain pass in the Vosges Mountains in the Haut-Rhin department of France, close to the summit of the Petit Ballon mountain.

It was crossed on Stage 10 of the 2014 Tour de France cycle race.

Details of climb
The climb proper starts at Luttenbach-près-Munster, where it leaves the D10.

From the north-west, the climb starts at Metzeral, passing through the village of Sondernach, where the route leaves the D10.

Tour de France
The col was used for the first time on Stage 10 of the 2014 Tour de France, when the leader over the summit was the Spanish rider, Joaquim Rodríguez.

Tour de France Femmes
The col was used on Stage 7 of the 2022 Tour de France Femmes, with Demi Vollering first over the summit.

References

Mountain passes of Grand Est 
Mountain passes of the Vosges